Sutch Road Bridge is a historic stone arch bridge located near Milford in Marlborough Township, Montgomery County, Pennsylvania. The bridge was built in 1910. The bridge crosses Unami Creek.

It was listed on the National Register of Historic Places in 1988.

References 

Road bridges on the National Register of Historic Places in Pennsylvania
Bridges completed in 1910
Bridges in Montgomery County, Pennsylvania
National Register of Historic Places in Montgomery County, Pennsylvania
Stone arch bridges in the United States